The Americas Zone was one of three zones of regional competition in the 2008 Fed Cup.

Group I
Venue: Club Deportivo El Rodeo, Medellín, Colombia (outdoor clay) 
Date: 30 January – 2 February

The seven teams were divided into two pools, one pool of four teams and one of three. The top team of each pool played against one other to decide which nation progresses to the World Group II Play-offs. The four nations coming third in each pool then played-off to determine which team would join the fourth-placed team from the four-team pool in being relegated down to Group II for 2009.

Pools

Play-offs

  advanced to 2008 World Group II Play-offs.

Group II
Venue: Country Club Cochabamba, Cochabamba, Bolivia (outdoor clay) 
Date: 23–26 April

The thirteen teams were divided into three pools of three teams and one pool of four. The top teams of each pool played-off against one other to decide which two nations progress to the Group I.

Pools

Play-offs

  and  advanced to Group I for 2009.

See also
Fed Cup structure

References

 Fed Cup Profile, Brazil
 Fed Cup Profile, Chile
 Fed Cup Profile, Paraguay
 Fed Cup Profile, Puerto Rico
 Fed Cup Profile, Trinidad and Tobago
 Fed Cup Profile, Dominican Republic
 Fed Cup Profile, Colombia
 Fed Cup Profile, Honduras
 Fed Cup Profile, Bermuda
 Fed Cup Profile, Canada
 Fed Cup Profile, Bolivia
 Fed Cup Profile, Panama
 Fed Cup Profile, Paraguay
 Fed Cup Profile, Bolivia
 Fed Cup Profile, Venezuela

External links
 Fed Cup website

 
Americas
Sport in Medellín
Tennis tournaments in Colombia
Sport in Cochabamba
Tennis tournaments in Bolivia
2008 in Colombian tennis